The 1900 United States presidential election in New York took place on November 6, 1900. All contemporary 45 states were part of the 1900 United States presidential election. Voters chose 36 electors to the Electoral College, which selected the president and vice president.

New York was won by the Republican nominees, incumbent President William McKinley of Ohio and his running mate Governor Theodore Roosevelt of New York. McKinley and Roosevelt defeated the Democratic nominees, former Congressman and 1896 presidential nominee William Jennings Bryan of Nebraska and his running mate former Vice President Adlai Stevenson I of Illinois. Also in the running was the Socialist candidate, Eugene V. Debs, who ran with Job Harriman.

McKinley carried New York State with 53.10 percent of the vote to Bryan’s 43.83 percent, a victory margin of 9.27 points.

New York weighed in for this election as about three percent more Republican than the national average. 

The 1900 election was a direct re-match between McKinley and Bryan who had run against each other four years earlier in 1896. While New York would continue its Republican dominance of the Fourth Party System and that McKinley had slightly improved on his national margin, the Empire State swung heavily in Bryan's favor in 1900. In 1896, McKinley had defeated Bryan in the state by 18.85 points, sweeping every county in the state except Palatine German Schoharie County, including rare Republican victories in New York City. McKinley’s 1900 margin of victory in New York State was less than half of his 1896 margin, primarily due to dramatic Democratic gains in New York City. While in 1896 Bryan had lost New York City by about 60,000 votes, in 1900 Bryan won a majority of over 30,000 votes in New York City, winning Manhattan, the Bronx, Queens, and Staten Island. Bryan would win New York City again against William Howard Taft in 1908. New York City would not vote Republican again until the Republican landslides of 1920 and 1924, and would subsequently become a reliably Democratic bastion in every election that followed.

Results

Results by county

See also
 Presidency of William McKinley

References

New York
1900
1900 New York (state) elections